The Blue Streak is a 1917 American silent Western film directed by William Nigh and starring Nigh, Violet Palmer and Ruth Thorp.

Cast
 William Nigh as The Blue Streak
 Violet Palmer as The Fledgeling
 Ruth Thorp as The Bar Fly
 Martin Faust as Half-and-Half
 Ned Finley as The Sheriff
 Edward Roseman as Butch
 Tom Cameron
 Danny Sullivan
 Edgar Kennedy
 Bert Gudgeon
 Marc B. Robbins

References

Bibliography
 Solomon, Aubrey. The Fox Film Corporation, 1915-1935: A History and Filmography. McFarland, 2011.

External links
 

1917 films
1917 Western (genre) films
1910s English-language films
Films directed by William Nigh
Fox Film films
Silent American Western (genre) films
1910s American films